Logi Jes Kristjánsson (born 21 April 1972) is a backstroke Icelandic swimmer. He competed in the men's 100 metre backstroke event at the 1996 Summer Olympics.

References

External links
 

1972 births
Living people
Icelandic male backstroke swimmers
Olympic swimmers of Iceland
Swimmers at the 1996 Summer Olympics
Place of birth missing (living people)